Chicago Life is a magazine included every other month in the Sunday edition of The New York Times in the Chicago area.

History and profile
Chicago Life was started in 1984 as a bimonthly independent magazine. In July 1987 it began to be published monthly. During the initial phase Pam Berns was the publisher.

Among its topics are politics, health, the arts, and style. Contributors to the publication often include: Pam Berns (Publisher), Jessica Curry (Editor), Jane Ammeson (Interviews), Marilyn Soltis (Home), Brett Neveu (Theatre), Pamela Dittmer McKuen (Style), Carmen Marti (Health), Sigalit Zetouni (Art) and Amelia Levin (Dining).

References

External links
 Chicago Life magazine

1984 establishments in Illinois
Bimonthly magazines published in the United States
Lifestyle magazines published in the United States
Monthly magazines published in the United States
Local interest magazines published in the United States
Magazines established in 1984
Magazines published in Chicago
Newspaper supplements
Sunday magazines